Olaf Johannessen may refer to:

 Olaf Johannessen (sport shooter) (1890–1977), Norwegian sport shooter
 Olaf Johannessen (actor) (born 1961), Faroese stage and film actor